Yemi Shodimu  (born 29 January 1960) is a Nigerian dramatist, television presenter, film director and filmmaker.

Early life
He was born in Abeokuta, the capital of Ogun State southwestern Nigeria.
He spent his early life in Abeokuta at the palace of Alake of Egbaland where he was exposed to the Yoruba culture.  
He attended Obafemi Awolowo University where he obtained a Bachelor of Arts (B.A.) degree in dramatic art and later proceeded to the University of Lagos where he received a Master of Arts (M.A.) degree in Mass communication.

Career
He began his acting career in 1976, the same year he featured in a movie titled  Village Head Master.
He was known for his lead role, Ajani in Oleku, a movie directed and produced by Tunde Kelani. In 2018, he was assigned as the producer of the satirical stage play franchise titled Isale Eko.

Filmography
Village Head Master that featured Victor Olaotan
Oleku (1997) produced by Tunde Kelani
Ti Oluwa Ni Ile
Saworoide that featured Kunle Afolayan and Peter Fatomilola
Ayo ni Mofe
Koseegbe
Diamonds In The Sky (2019)
The Miracle Centre (2020)

See also
List of Nigerian actors

References

Living people
1960 births
Nigerian male film actors
Yoruba male actors
Male actors from Abeokuta
Male actors in Yoruba cinema
University of Lagos alumni
Obafemi Awolowo University alumni
20th-century Nigerian male actors
21st-century Nigerian male actors
Nigerian male television actors
Nigerian dramatists and playwrights
Nigerian television presenters
Nigerian film directors
20th-century births
Nigerian film producers